Leeward is the opposite of Windward.

Leeward may also refer to:

Places 
 Leeward Islands (disambiguation)
 Leeward Antilles, a chain of islands in the Caribbean
 Leeward Community College, Hawaii
 Leeward Passage
 Leeward Point Field, airfield at Guantanamo

Other uses 
 Leewards Creative Crafts, a defunct store
 Jimmy Leeward, pilot
 Leeward 16, an American sailboat design

See also
 Lee Ward, Canadian academic
 Lee (disambiguation)
 Ward (disambiguation)
 Wardley (disambiguation)